John Gall may refer to:

John Gall (author) (1925–2014), American author, pediatrician, and theorist of systems
John Gall (baseball) (born 1978), Major League Baseball player
John Gall (designer) (born 1963), American graphic designer